Valentín Vergara (1879-1930) was an Argentine lawyer and politician, who served as national deputy and governor of the Province of Buenos Aires.

References

External links 

1879 births
1930 deaths
Governors of Buenos Aires Province
People from Buenos Aires
Burials at La Recoleta Cemetery
Argentine legal professionals